Debby (1966 – November 17, 2008) was a female polar bear, considered by scholars as the world's oldest. She lived in the Assiniboine Park Zoo in Winnipeg. In August 2008, the Guinness World Records certified her as not only the oldest polar bear, but one of the three oldest individuals ever recorded of all eight bear species.

Debby was born in the Soviet Arctic in 1966, and subsequently orphaned; she arrived in Winnipeg when she was a year old.

While in captivity, she had six cubs with her mate Skipper.

In November 2008, she was found to have multiple organ dysfunction syndrome, and was subsequently euthanized. She was 41 years old.

See also
 List of individual bears

References

Individual polar bears
1966 animal births
2008 animal deaths
Animal deaths by euthanasia
Female mammals
Individual animals in Canada
Oldest animals